

See also 
 South Carolina's 8th congressional district special election, 1805
 United States House of Representatives elections, 1804 and 1805
 List of United States representatives from South Carolina

Notes 

1804
South Carolina
United States House of Representatives